is a former Japanese football player and manager. He played for Japan national team. He also worked as a football commentator.

Club career
Matsuki was born in Chuo, Tokyo on November 28, 1957. He joined Japan Soccer League Division 2 club Yomiuri from youth team in 1973. The club was promoted to Division 1 in 1978. The club won the champions in Japan Soccer League 3 times, JSL Cup 2 times and Emperor's Cup 3 times. From 1983, he also served as captain. This was golden era in club history. He retired in 1990. He played 269 games and scored 9 goals in the league. He was selected Best Eleven 3 times.

National team career
In April 1984, Matsuki was selected Japan national team for 1984 Summer Olympics qualification. At this qualification, on April 15, he debuted against Thailand. He also played at 1986 World Cup qualification and 1986 Asian Games. He played 11 games for Japan until 1986.

Coaching career
After retirement, Matsuki started coaching career at Yomiuri (later Verdy Kawasaki, Tokyo Verdy) in 1990. In 1993, he became a manager. The club won the champions at J1 League and J.League Cup and he was selected Best Manager awards for 2 years in a row (1993-1994). He resigned end of 1994 season. In 1998, he signed with Cerezo Osaka and managed in 1 season. In 2001, he returned to Tokyo Verdy in the first year after relocating to Tokyo. However he was sacked in July.

Video games
Matsuki appeared on the cover of the Japanese version of World Cup Striker, a soccer game released in 1994 for the Super NES. In the PlayStation title J-League Jikkyō Winning Eleven 97, Matsuki comments the matches alongside Jon Kabira.

Club statistics

National team statistics

Managerial statistics

Honours

Player
Yomiuri
Japan Soccer League Division 1: 1983, 1984, 1986–87
Emperor's Cup: 1984, 1986, 1987
JSL Cup: 1979, 1985

Manager
Tokyo Verdy
J.League Division 1: 1993, 1994
J.League Cup: 1993, 1994

Individual
J.League Manager of the Year: 1993, 1994

References

External links

Japan National Football Team Database

1957 births
Living people
Association football people from Tokyo
Japanese footballers
Japan international footballers
Japan Soccer League players
Tokyo Verdy players
Japanese football managers
J1 League managers
Tokyo Verdy managers
Cerezo Osaka managers
Footballers at the 1986 Asian Games
Association football defenders
Association football commentators
Asian Games competitors for Japan